Pixie Hollow is a character meet and greet attraction at Disneyland and Hong Kong Disneyland, offering guests the opportunity to meet Tinker Bell and her friends from the Disney Fairies franchise, including: Vidia, Terrence, Fawn, Rosetta, Silvermist, Iridessa, and Periwinkle. The attraction is designed to create the illusion of gradually shrinking to Pixie size as the scenic elements in the queue increase in scale as guests approach Tinker Bell's teapot house.

Disneyland 
Beneath the Pixie Hollow sign, guests can spot a large block of concrete painted with "Go Away Green" paint, Disney's signature paint color that they use to make objects less noticeable to park guests. This area's cement is the last remaining footprint of the long-gone Monsanto House of the Future attraction, which resided in Disneyland's Tomorrowland from 1957 to 1967. It was too much work to remove the solid cement base, so it was painted with the patented "Go Away Green" color and covered by plants.

In 2008, this area replaced Disneyland's Ariel's Grotto section. A fountain used to be located in the pond of King Triton that would spray water from the end of his trident. That statue was moved and placed on top of the new attraction The Little Mermaid: Ariel's Undersea Adventure in Disney California Adventure.

Magic Kingdom 
The Pixie Hollow area within Mickey's Toontown Fair at Magic Kingdom at the Walt Disney World Resort closed in February 2011, as part of the New Fantasyland expansion. A larger Pixie Hollow area was included in the original plans for the expansion, but they have since been abandoned. On July 28, 2011, Tinkerbell and her friends returned to the Magic Kingdom at "Tinker Bell's Magical Nook," located in the Adventureland Veranda. The attraction closed on May 20, 2014. There is now a new meet and greet area for Tinker Bell inside the Town Square Theater in the park's Main Street U.S.A. area.

Hong Kong Disneyland
While Pixie Hollow originally premiered in the park in 2011, the 10th anniversary celebration of Hong Kong Disneyland involved the opening of a new version of the area, as part of Fairy Tale Forest (an entrance between The Garden of Cinderella and The Garden of Little Mermaid). This new walk through attraction opened on December 17, 2015.

See also

 2011 in amusement parks

External links
Go Away Green

References

Disney Fairies
Amusement attractions under construction
Peter Pan (franchise)
Walt Disney Parks and Resorts attractions
Amusement rides introduced in 2011
Amusement rides introduced in 2015
Amusement rides that closed in 2014
Amusement rides planned to open in 2024
Disneyland
Hong Kong Disneyland
Tokyo DisneySea
Fantasyland
Adventureland (Disney)
Mickey's Toontown
Fantasy Springs (Tokyo DisneySea)